Nick Crosswell (born 3 April 1986) is a New Zealand rugby union player who currently plays for  in the Mitre 10 Cup.

Playing career

Provincial Rugby

Crosswell made his debut for Manawatu in the 2006 Air New Zealand Cup and his strong work rate and solid tackling quickly established him as a starter for the side.

Crosswell was named team captain for the 2011 ITM Cup, but suffered through a difficult season as injury limited him to just four starts. In his absence, Manawatu finished second from the bottom of the table in the competition. Both Crosswell and the team had a vastly improved 2011, however, as he started every game as captain in helping the team to the Championship Final of the ITM Cup.

Super Rugby

Crosswell was named in the Hurricanes squad for the 2010 Super 14 season, after impressing in provincial rugby for Manawatu. He managed to establish himself as a reliable loose forward for the club, appearing in 9 of their 13 matches including two starts.

For the 2011 Super Rugby season, Crosswell transferred south to join the Highlanders. In his first season for the Highlanders, Crosswell was used primarily coming off the bench, but he became a more regular starter in 2012.

For the 2013 Super Rugby season, Crosswell transferred north to the Chiefs.

Move to Wales

In January 2015, Crosswell joined the Welsh regional team Newport Gwent Dragons He was released at the end of the 2016–17 season.

References

External links
Dragons Profile

1986 births
Highlanders (rugby union) players
Hurricanes (rugby union) players
Chiefs (rugby union) players
Manawatu rugby union players
Dragons RFC players
Living people
New Zealand rugby union players
Rugby union locks
Rugby union flankers
Māori All Blacks players
New Zealand expatriate sportspeople in Wales
Rugby union players from Manawatū-Whanganui